Providence is the sixth novel by Australian science fiction author Max Barry.  It was published in March 2020 by Putnam.

Plot
Humans have been exploring other star systems for some time, prior to encountering another race of intelligent space travelers.  The aliens are hostile, and war broke out seven years prior to the departure of the warship Providence, and its crew of four, composed of Gilly, Talia, Anders, and Jackson. The crew were partially chosen for the attractive image they will project in the social media messages they transmit back to the home front, while a computer actually runs the ship.  Two years into the mission, after the ship has already destroyed one alien colony, mental instability begins to affect the crew.

Reception 
When it compared Providence with other recently published science fiction novels, the Financial Times wrote "Providence is smart and fun but it's no classic".

A review by The Associated Press compared the novel to Robert Heinlein's Starship Troopers and Mary Doria Russell's The Sparrow - although updated "for the internet age".

The review in Locus compared the novel to Starship Troopers, Barry N. Malzberg's Galaxies, Michael Moorcock's The Black Corridor, the television show Red Dwarf, and Ridley Scott's Alien.

References

2020 Australian novels
2020 science fiction novels
Australian science fiction novels
Space exploration novels
G. P. Putnam's Sons books
Hodder & Stoughton books
Novels about extraterrestrial life